Elkin Antonio Murillo Amor (born 20 September 1977) is a retired Colombian football striker.

Murillo has made 28 appearances for the Colombia national football team, including two matches at the 2003 FIFA Confederations Cup. He also won the 2001 Copa América with Colombia's national team.

References

External links

1977 births
Living people
People from Quibdó
Colombian footballers
Colombia international footballers
Deportes Quindío footballers
Independiente Medellín footballers
Deportivo Cali footballers
L.D.U. Quito footballers
Atlético Nacional footballers
Sporting Cristal footballers
C.D. Técnico Universitario footballers
Deportes Tolima footballers
Deportivo Pereira footballers
Cortuluá footballers
Categoría Primera A players
Ecuadorian Serie A players
Peruvian Primera División players
Colombian expatriate footballers
Expatriate footballers in Ecuador
Expatriate footballers in Peru
2001 Copa América players
2003 FIFA Confederations Cup players
2003 CONCACAF Gold Cup players
2004 Copa América players
Copa América-winning players
Association football midfielders
Sportspeople from Chocó Department